Pedro García Ferrer (1583–1660), the Licentiate, an ecclesiastic and painter of some reputation at Valencia, executed some pictures for the altar of San Vicente Ferrer in the convent of San Domingo, and practised his art at Madrid. Cean Bermudez mentions a Crucifixion by him, dated 1632, then in the possession of Don Mariano Ferrer, secretary of the Academy of San Carlos.

References

Attribution:
 

1583 births
1660 deaths
17th-century Spanish painters
Spanish male painters
People from Valencia